In baseball, a home run occurs when the ball is hit in such a way that the batter is able to circle the bases and reach home safely in one play without any errors being committed by the defensive team in the process. In modern baseball, the feat is typically achieved by hitting the ball over the outfield fence between the foul poles (or making contact with either foul pole) without first touching the ground, resulting in an automatic home run. There is also the "inside-the-park" home run where the batter reaches home safely while the baseball is in play on the field.

Eighteen players have hit four home runs in a single Major League Baseball (MLB) game, which writers of Sporting News described as "baseball's greatest single-game accomplishment". The most recent to accomplish the feat to date is J. D. Martinez with the Arizona Diamondbacks against the Los Angeles Dodgers on September 4, 2017. No player has done this more than once in his career. In the pre-professional era, Lipman Pike also hit five home runs in 1866.

According to the Society for American Baseball Research, Oil Cities catcher Jay J. Clarke went 8-8 with eight home runs, a single-game professional record. However, Clarke’s total is still disputed, reported by some newspapers as three homers and eight runs scored, but there is no surviving box score to help confirm or deny his feat.

Bobby Lowe was the first to hit four home runs in a single game, doing so on May 30, 1894 for the Boston Beaneaters. Fans were reportedly so excited that they threw $160 in silver coins ($ today) onto the field after his fourth home run. Of all players to achieve the feat, Lowe hit the fewest career home runs, with a total of 71.  Two years after Lowe's feat, Ed Delahanty of the Philadelphia Phillies became the second player to hit four home runs in a game.  Two other Phillies players have achieved the feat, Chuck Klein in 1932 and Mike Schmidt in 1976.  Two other current franchises, the Atlanta Braves (with three) and the Los Angeles Dodgers (with two), have had multiple four-homer games in their history and share the distinction of having one four-homer game in each city they have called home (for the Braves, Boston, Milwaukee, and Atlanta; for the Dodgers, Brooklyn and Los Angeles). Five current franchises – the Braves, Baltimore Orioles, Chicago Cubs, Cincinnati Reds, and Oakland Athletics – share the record of having surrendered two four-homer games over their histories. Thirteen of the 30 franchises (as of 2021) have achieved at least one four-homer game, and 12 franchises have surrendered at least one. Eleven have never been involved in a four-homer game at all, although only three of these (Boston Red Sox, Detroit Tigers, Minnesota Twins) have existences dating to before the 1960s expansion era.

Despite Delahanty's achievement on July 13, 1896, the Phillies lost to the Chicago Colts, one of only two occasions when a player hit four home runs but finished on the losing team.  The other such occasion took place in 1986, when Bob Horner struck four home runs for the Braves but the Montreal Expos emerged victorious.  Following Delahanty's four-home run game in 1896, no other player would accomplish the feat for nearly 36 years, the longest gap between such occurrences.  The shortest interval took place in 2002, when Mike Cameron hit his four on May 2, 2002, and Shawn Green repeated the feat 21 days later, on May 23.  This was the first time two players had achieved a four-homer game in the same season; this would occur again in 2017 when Scooter Gennett and J. D. Martinez achieved the feat in June and September respectively.  When Martinez struck his four home runs for the Arizona Diamondbacks against the Los Angeles Dodgers, he became the first player with a four-homer game to hit more homers than his opponents gained base hits.

These games have resulted in other MLB single-game records due to the extreme offensive performance. Mark Whiten tied Jim Bottomley for the most runs batted in in a single game with 12 in his four-homer game. Shawn Green hit a double and a single along with his four home runs for 19 total bases, an MLB record. It surpassed Joe Adcock's mark of 18, which also came from a four-homer game. Carlos Delgado is the only player to make four plate appearances in a game and hit a home run each time. Warren Spahn pitched the ball which Gil Hodges hit for the first of his four, the only Hall of Fame pitcher faced during a four-home-run game.  Of the 14 players eligible for the Hall of Fame who have hit four home runs in a game, six have been elected. Players are eligible for the Hall of Fame if they have played in at least 10 major league seasons and have been either retired for five seasons or deceased for at least six months. These requirements leave three players ineligible who are living and have played in the past five seasons and one (Seerey) who did not play 10 seasons in MLB.

Players

Note: RBI and TB counts include all plate appearances the player had in the game.

Source:

Unofficial four-home run games
Only one player has ever hit four home runs in a single Spring Training game: Henry Rodriguez of the Los Angeles Dodgers hit four home runs against the New York Mets on April 24, 1995.

References

External links
 MON@ATL: Bob Horner hits his fourth home run of game from MLB via YouTube
 STL@CIN: Whiten blasts four dingers, drives in 12 from MLB via YouTube
 SEA@CWS: Cameron hits four homers in the game from MLB via YouTube
 Green has monster day at the plate from MLB via YouTube
 TB@TOR: Delgado blasts four homers in the game from MLB via YouTube
 TEX@BAL: Hamilton goes 5-for-5 with four homers from MLB via YouTube
 Gennett and Martinez both hit 4 homers in a game from MLB via YouTube

Home runs, single game
Home runs, single game